Robert Edward Chesney (born August 10, 1977) is an American football coach. On December 14, 2017, he was named the 28th head football coach at the College of the Holy Cross in Worcester, Massachusetts.

A graduate of Dickinson College, Chesney was previously the head coach at Assumption College in Worcester, Massachusetts from 2013 to 2017, leading the Greyhounds to three consecutive NCAA Division II playoff appearances in the last three years of his tenure.

Prior to that, he was the head coach at Division III Salve Regina University in Newport, Rhode Island from 2010 to 2012.

Coaching career
Chesney was hired as the fourth head coach in Salve University football program history following his five-year stint as associate head coach at Johns Hopkins University. Chesney rebuilt a Salve Regina program which had a streak of eight-consecutive losing seasons before his tenure, upon which he posted three winning campaigns in a row. Following his success with that program, Chesney was hired as the tenth head coach in Assumption College football program history. Prior to his arrival the Assumption program had posted two winning seasons in the 17 previous years.   Chesney led the Greyhounds to five-straight winning records and NCAA Tournament appearances in each of his last three years.  Chesney coached 94 all-conference selections and 12 All-Americans.

Head coaching record

References

External links
 Holy Cross profile

1977 births
Living people
American football defensive backs
Assumption Greyhounds football coaches
Delaware Valley Aggies football coaches
Dickinson Red Devils football players
Holy Cross Crusaders football coaches
King's College Monarchs football coaches
Johns Hopkins Blue Jays football coaches
Norwich Cadets football coaches
Salve Regina Seahawks football coaches
People from Ashland, Pennsylvania